Pavel Mikhalevich (born 22 January 1975) is a Belarusian former footballer who last played as a midfielder.

Career

Mikhalevich started his career with Dutch sixth tier side Quick 1888. In 1993, Mikhalevich signed for NEC in the Dutch second tier, where he made over 47 league appearances and scored 1 goal and suffered a torn achilles tendon. In 2001, he signed for Dutch fifth tier club JVC Cuijk.

References

External links
 

1975 births
Achilles '29 players
Association football midfielders
Belarusian expatriate footballers
Belarusian expatriate sportspeople in the Netherlands
Belarusian footballers
Eerste Divisie players
Eredivisie players
Expatriate footballers in the Netherlands
Vierde Divisie players
JVC Cuijk players
NEC Nijmegen players
Quick 1888 players
Footballers from Minsk
Living people